Rhynchopsidium is a genus of South African plants in the tribe Gnaphalieae within the family Asteraceae.

 Species
 Rhynchopsidium pumilum (L.f.) DC.
 Rhynchopsidium sessiliflorum (L.f.) DC.

References

Gnaphalieae
Asteraceae genera
Endemic flora of South Africa